The Royal Hobart Golf Club is a golf club in Seven Mile Beach, Tasmania, Australia, near Hobart. It hosted the Australian Open in 1971 when American Jack Nicklaus was the winner. It also hosted the Tasmanian Open (1968, 1976, 1980, 1986, 1991, and 2003), Australian Amateur (1968, 1974, 1987, 1993, 2000, and 2006), and Australian Women's Amateur (1968, 1978, 1990, and 1997).

Jason Day in capturing the Australian Amateur Championship winner in 2006 held at the Royal Hobart Golf Club, shot the course record of 64 to break the course record previously held by Jack Nicklaus.

On 5 April 2021 the outgoing club pro Simon Hawkes, shot a new course record of 61 which was highlighted by an albatross on the iconic 9th hole.

Designed by Vern Morcom, who was also responsible for the Woodrising Course at Devonport Golf Club, Spreyton.

Notable Members 
Bruce Pearce Australian Open
Clyde Pearce 1908 Australian Open
Elvie Whiteside Australian Ladies Championship
Betty Dalgleish 1958 Tasmanian senior championship, 1968 Australian Ladies Championship, 1973 Ladies Professional Golf Association of Australia
Lindy Goggin 1971, 1977 and 1980 Australian Ladies Championship, 1973, 1976, 1980 and 1986 Victorian Amateur, Tasmanian Amateur Champion 19 times from 1976 to 1991
Peter Toogood 1954 Australian Amateur Champion, 1956 New Zealand Amateur Champion, Tasmanian Open Champion 1948, 49, 51, 55, 59, 60, 62, 66, 72, 78
Mathew Goggin 1994 Australian Amateur Championship, 1996 San Paolo Vita Open, 1998 Australasian Tour Championship, 1999 Omaha Classic

See also
List of golf clubs granted Royal status

References

External links

Royal Hobart Golf Club course review, Golf Australia

1896 establishments in Australia
Sports clubs established in 1896
Sports venues completed in 1896
Sports venues in Hobart
Golf clubs and courses in Tasmania
Organisations based in Australia with royal patronage
Sport in Hobart
Royal golf clubs